Ride is a motorcycle racing video game developed and published by Milestone srl. The game was released on March 27, 2015, in Europe, and on October 6, 2015 in North America for Microsoft Windows, PlayStation 3, PlayStation 4, Xbox One, and Xbox 360.

Development
On September 15, 2014, Milestone announced the development of Ride, a motorcycle racing video game.  The studio had previously developed racing games within the licensed series World Rally Championship, MotoGP, SBK and MXGP.

Reception

Many reviewers described the game as "Forza Motorsport with bikes." It was also noted as being more accessible to newcomers than other bike games. One complaint was the long loading times.
The game reached number 10 in the UK PS3 sales charts, and number 13 in the PS4 charts.

Sequels
Ride 2 was released for PC on October 7, 2016, and for Xbox One and PlayStation 4 on February 14, 2017. It features around 200 bikes from 15 different categories (as opposed to the 4 categories in the original game) with additional bike customization options. Tracks include Macau and Ulster.

Ride 3 was released on November 30, 2018 for Xbox One, PS4 and Microsoft Windows. The game features 230 bikes, from 1966 to current-day. The track list was expanded to 30, including Garda Lake, Imatra, and Tenerife.

Ride 4 was announced on December 4, 2019 on the official Ride page on Facebook and was released on October 8, 2020 for Microsoft Windows, PlayStation 4, and Xbox One, for PlayStation 5 and Xbox Series X/S on January 21, 2021, and for Amazon Luna on April 8, 2021, with features dynamic weather, time of day, endurance racing and pitstops. In September 2021, a gameplay video went viral, with the wet-weather graphics looking so good that people confused it with real life. The video amassed more than 3 million views in just over a week.

It was nominated for "Best Italian Game" at the Italian Video Game Awards.

See also
 List of driving and racing video games

References 

2015 video games
Video game franchises introduced in 2015
Video games developed in Italy
Motorcycle video games
Racing video games
PlayStation 3 games
PlayStation 4 games
Windows games
Xbox 360 games
Xbox One games
Multiplayer and single-player video games
Split-screen multiplayer games
Video games set in Argentina
Video games set in England
Video games set in Florida
Video games set in France
Video games set in Italy
Video games set in Japan
Video games set in Macau
Video games set in Monaco
Video games set in Northern Ireland
Video games set in Spain
Video games set in Wales
Video games set in Wisconsin
Embracer Group franchises
Milestone srl games